A thumbnail gallery post (TGP) is a website that provides links to free Internet pornography. TGP sites consist of categorized lists (more often tables) of small pictures (called "thumbnails") linked to full-size images or redirected to another website. Sites containing thumbs that lead to galleries with video content are called movie gallery posts (MGP). The main benefit of TGP/MGP is that the surfer can browse through the thumbnails to get an impression of the content provided by a gallery without actually visiting it, saving on broadband usage.

However, TGP sites are open to abuse, with the most abusive form being “circle jerk” TGP sites (CJ), that contain links that misdirect surfers to sites they did not wish to see. 

Many TGP sites are free to users, but commonly are ad-driven. In affiliate marketing terms, TGPs are the affiliates that drive new traffic to the product producers, paysites. Paysites offer free hosted galleries (FHGs) in an effort to attract paying customers, and it is these FHGs, as well as chains of TGPs, that a TGP links to.

Traffic trading and TGP scripts
TGPs employ a variety of schemes to trade traffic with other TGPs; signing up for these trades is usually easy and free for other TGP owners. Perhaps the most basic trade is to link to other TGP sites.

These trades are reciprocal: by looking at the referrer header of the HTTP requests, a TGP owner knows where their traffic comes from; a site that doesn't provide enough visitors will be excluded from further trades. Both of these traffic trade schemes are therefore susceptible to cheating: a trader can use so-called hitbots to create bogus traffic from his site to another, in order to get good traffic in return.

Scripts that automate the maintenance of a TGP, manage traffic trades and protect against hitbots are readily available. Some of these are even free, financed by an occasional redirecting of surfers to a site under the control of the script's programmer, or by advertisements directed at other webmasters on the gallery submission and traffic trade pages.

TGP2
The success of the TGP format forced some adult webmasters to rethink their role in promotion of commercial sites. Some webmasters believe that TGPs saturate the Internet with free pornography. A new format for organizing previews was tried. This format, named TGP2, limits the exposure of the surfer to free content in many ways. For example, no more than 12 thumbnails are allowed per page, of which only 5 can link to images (and not directly, but to pages with images and ads) and the rest must link to signup pages. Per the standard, TGP2 galleries only include softcore images and may not link to TGP sites. Most TGP sites do not allow TGP2 galleries to be listed. The concept received little approval among web surfers and high traffic levels were never achieved.

Fake TGPs
Some websites appear to be TGPs, yet all or most of the featured galleries belong to the same webmaster and promote a limited selection of commercial websites. Such fake TGPs often contain links to other fake TGP sites owned by the same group or individual. Paysite owners produce and host ready-made galleries known as free hosted galleries for use on these fake TGPs.

Many sponsors also provide webmasters with TGP templates which feature rotating galleries of the sponsor's sites. All a webmaster has to do is link the site using their referral code and surfers are provided with freshly updated content (often changing with each reload).

Circle jerk (CJ) TGP
These sites look like TGP sites but end up sending users on a 'circle jerk' of blind links. When users click on a gallery link provided by a TGP, they will be unwillingly redirected to another TGP instead. Many legitimate TGPs do this to some extent, either by having some links redirect to other TGPs, or by having all links do so a certain percentage of the time. CJ TGPs almost never have any real content. The method of earnings for these sites are selling large volumes of traffic, non-adult sponsors (who sell virus protection, adware scanning, privacy protection, web history cleaning software) and adult sponsors.

Security concerns while browsing CJ sites
Many CJs attempt to trap the hapless viewer by resizing the browser window, opening new windows or installing spyware, adware or dialers (for instance by having the user download a trojan horse fake codec such as Trojan.Emcodec.E or exploiting browser bugs), changing the home page and adding bookmarks. It is therefore advisable to visit these sites only when Java, ActiveX and JavaScript as well as other scripting languages have been disabled in the browser and the system is fully patched. Users who are infected with potentially unwanted programs (PUPs) and other malicious software usually end up with a variety of issues, like modified host files, endless popup ads (originating from the user's own computer) browser redirects, etc.

References

See also
 Fusker software

Erotica and pornography websites